Fengnan District is a district of Tangshan, Hebei, China on the coast of the Bo Sea and bordering Tianjin to the west.

Administrative divisions

Subdistricts:
Xugezhuang Subdistrict

Towns:
Fengnan Town, Daodi, Qianying, Tangfang, Huanggezhuang, Xige, Xiaoji, Wanglanzhuang, Daxinzhuang, Liushuquan, Binhai, Heiyanzi, Daqigezhuang

Townships:
Nansunzhuang Township, Dongtianzhuang Township, Jianzigu Township

There is the Tangshan Nanbao Development Zone

Climate

References

External links

 

County-level divisions of Hebei
Tangshan